Ida Elionsky (1902 – 1983) was a champion long-distance swimmer and handicap swimmer. She was the first woman to swim around the island of Manhattan.

Biography
Elionsky was the sister of Henry Elionsky, also a champion swimmer of that era. She set the long distance swimming record on September 24, 1916 when she swam around Manhattan, in 11 hours and 35 minutes. She had her brother tied to her back.

References

External links
Ida Elionsky at NYCSwim

1902 births
1983 deaths
American female swimmers
Manhattan Island swimmers